The Free Houdini (styled as theFREEhoudini) is a 2009 mixtape by American hip hop duo Themselves.

It is a return after a six-year hiatus that saw the members, Jel and Doseone, spend the majority of their time on their other band Subtle. It was made available for 90 days as a one-track MP3 for download from the Anticon website, later released in a deluxe CD package.

Critical reception
At Metacritic, which assigns a weighted average score out of 100 to reviews from mainstream critics, the mixtape received an average score of 74% based on 6 reviews, indicating "generally favorable reviews".

Jer Fairall of PopMatters gave the mixtape 8 stars out of 10, saying, "Here, Doseone is once again utilizing his skills as a performer to propel the music forward, and the result is a record that is actually thrilling and fun to listen to, rather than simply 'interesting'." Jayson Greene of Pitchfork gave the mixtape a 6.6 out of 10 and called it "another step in Anticon's breathless, never-ending push forward."

Track listing

References

External links
 

2009 mixtape albums
Themselves albums
Anticon albums